Legarda is a hamlet and council located in the municipality of Vitoria-Gasteiz, in Álava province, Basque Country, Spain. As of 2020, it has a population of 38.

Geography 
Legarda is located 11km northwest of Vitoria-Gasteiz.

References

Populated places in Álava